Color Splash is an American television show on the U.S. cable network HGTV, hosted by David Bromstad.

The series was created for Bromstad after winning season one of HGTV Design Star. It debuted March 19, 2007, on HGTV. The show focuses on transforming rooms by dramatic uses of color.

The show also features color specialist and carpenter Danielle Hirsch, who debuted on HGTV's Design Remix starring Karen McAloon.

Color Splash relocated from San Francisco to Miami in 2010.

References

HGTV original programming
2007 American television series debuts
2012 American television series endings